Dino Prižmić (born 5 August 2005) is a Croatian tennis player. Prižmić has a career-high ATP singles ranking of No. 475 achieved on 26 December 2022. He also has a career-high ATP doubles ranking of No. 1505 achieved on 9 May 2022.

Career
Prižmić mainly plays on the junior circuit with a current ranking of No. 10 which is also a career high. His best junior result was a semifinal appearance in the singles draw of the 2022 French Open Junior where he lost to eventual champion Gabriel Debru in three sets.

Prižmić made his first ITF final in April at a tournament in Croatia where he lost to Gergely Madarász in straight sets.

Prižmić made his ATP debut in the singles draw of the 2022 Croatia Open Umag as a wildcard where he lost to Bernabé Zapata Miralles in the first round by retirement.

Career finals

Singles: 6 (5–1)

References

External links

2005 births
Living people
Croatian male tennis players
Tennis players from Split, Croatia
21st-century Croatian people